"Mishale" is the debut single of Jamaican musician Andru Donalds. The song was written by Donalds and Eric Foster White, who also produced the track, and it was released on 29 September 1994 as the first single from Donalds' eponymous debut studio album. Described as a pop-R&B song with reggae qualities, "Mishale" experienced success in North America, German-speaking Europe, and New Zealand. On early promotional formats of the single, Donalds was credited as "A. Dee".

Critical reception
Billboard magazine editor Larry Flick wrote about the single on the issue of 1 October 1994, comparing "Mishale" with songs by Terence Trent D'Arby and Seal but describing it as "far more jubilant and likely to inspire countless hours of jiggling".

Chart performance
Released on 24 September 1994, "Mishale" debuted at number 92 on the US Billboard Hot 100 in December 1994, rising to its peak of number 38 on 11 February 1995. In Canada, it climbed to number four on the RPM Top Singles chart on the issue of 27 February 1995, finishing the year as the country's 27th-best-performing single. It was also successful in German-speaking Europe, peaking at numbers 16, 18, and 13 in Austria, Germany, and Switzerland, respectively. In the latter two countries, the single stayed on the charts for over 30 weeks and finished within the top 30 on the 1995 year-end rankings. "Mishale" was a top-ten hit in New Zealand, reaching number seven for two weeks in April 1995. It was Donalds' only hit single outside German-speaking Europe, where his cover of Air Supply's "All Out of Love" reached the top three.

Track listings

US cassette single
 "Mishale" – 4:01
 "Cryin' in the Rain" – 4:09

UK and European 12-inch single
A1. "Mishale" (extended pop club mix) – 5:24
A2. "Mishale" (Underground House Love Dub) – 6:49
A3. "Mishale" (R&B mix) – 4:32
B1. "Mishale" (dub culture) – 6:43
B2. "Mishale" (club dub) – 7:14

Dutch maxi-CD single
 "Mishale" (single mix) – 4:01
 "Mishale" (alternative radio mix) – 4:01
 "Mishale" (Luv Dup's Mekon Mix) – 7:48

Japanese mini-CD single
 "Mishale" – 4:01
 "Ronnie Don't Fall" – 4:47

Charts

Weekly charts

Year-end charts

References

1994 songs
1994 debut singles
Capitol Records singles
Contemporary R&B songs
Jamaican reggae songs
Jamaican pop songs
Songs written by Eric Foster White